Tin Vukmanić (born 17 April 1999) is a Croatian professional footballer who plays for Rudeš.

References

External links
 
 Player's profile at pressball.by

1999 births
Living people
Sportspeople from Karlovac
Association football midfielders
Croatian footballers
GNK Dinamo Zagreb II players
NK Inter Zaprešić players
Virtus Francavilla Calcio players
FK Spartaks Jūrmala players
FK RFS players
FC Shakhtyor Soligorsk players
FC Sputnik Rechitsa players
NK Rudeš players
Croatian Football League players
Serie C players
Latvian Higher League players
Belarusian Premier League players
First Football League (Croatia) players
Croatian expatriate footballers
Expatriate footballers in Italy
Expatriate footballers in Latvia
Expatriate footballers in Belarus
Croatian expatriate sportspeople in Italy
Croatian expatriate sportspeople in Latvia
Croatian expatriate sportspeople in Belarus